Inez Haynes Irwin (March 2, 1873 – September 25, 1970) was an American feminist author, journalist, member of the National Women's Party, and president of the Authors Guild. Many of her works were published under her former name Inez Haynes Gillmore. She wrote over 40 books and was active in the suffragist movement in the early 1900s. Irwin was a "rebellious and daring woman", but referred to herself as "the most timid of created beings". She died at the age of 97.

Irwin was a close friend of the American feminist writer Mary MacLane, who included a colorful personality portrait of Irwin in her newspaper articles in Butte, Montana, in 1910.

Early years and education
Inez Haynes was born on March 2, 1873, in Rio de Janeiro, Brazil, to Gideon Haynes and Emma Jane (Hopkins) Haynes. Her parents were from Boston in the United States, but were staying in Brazil because of her father's business problems. Her mother, her father's second wife, was 24 years younger than him, and had to raise a family of 17 children (10 of whom were her own). 

The family returned to Boston where Inez Haynes grew up. She attended four public schools, and then Radcliffe College between 1897 and 1900. At the time Radcliffe was a "center of suffragist sentiment", and Inez Haynes and Maud Wood Park founded the College Equal Suffrage League, which later became the National College Equal Suffrage League.

Career
In August 1897, Inez Haynes married Rufus H. Gillmore, a newspaper editor, and assumed the name Inez Haynes Gillmore. The Gillmores visited pre-War Europe where she met Russian revolutionaries and French impressionist painters. While her husband supported her feminism, they later divorced. She published her first novel, June Jeopardy in 1908 and soon after became fiction editor of The Masses, a left-wing monthly magazine. In January 1916, she married writer William Henry Irwin, and her name changed to Inez Haynes Irwin, although she continued publishing under her former name, Inez Haynes Gillmore. The Irwins summered in Scituate, Massachusetts, during the early 1900s. During World War I the Irwins lived in Europe where she worked as a war correspondent in England, France and Italy. Inez Haynes estimated that between 500,000 and 750,000 women were killed in the war. William Henry died in 1948 and she moved to Scituate, Massachusetts, where she remained until her death at the age of 97 on September 25, 1970.

Inez Haynes was a feminist leader and a political activist. She was a member of the National Advisory Council of the National Women's Party, and wrote the Party's biography, The Story of the Woman's Party, in 1921. She also wrote a history of American women, Angels and Amazons: A Hundred Years of American Women (1933).

Writing career
Apart from the non-fiction works noted above, she published over 30 novels, including Angel Island (1914), a "radical feminist Swiftian fantasy" about a group of men stranded on an island occupied by winged women. Angel Island was republished in 1988 as a "classic of early feminist literature" with an introduction by science fiction and fantasy author Ursula K. Le Guin. Her fiction often addressed feminist issues and the plight of women, including divorce, single parenthood and problems in the workplace.

Her 15-book "Maida" series of children's books was written over a period of 45 years, and tells the story of a school girl whose mother has died and whose father is very wealthy.

She also wrote short stories for magazines, one of which, "The Spring Flight," won her the O. Henry Memorial Prize in 1924.

Associations
Author's Guild of America, vice-President, 1930–1931; president, 1931–1933
National Collegiate Equal Suffrage League, co-founder
Chairman of board of directors of the World Center for Women's Archives, 1936–1938/1940.
Member of American committee of Prix Femina, 1931–1933
Source: Feminist Science Fiction, Fantasy and Utopia

Awards
O. Henry Award, 1924 – for her short story, "The Spring Flight"
Source: Feminist Science Fiction, Fantasy and Utopia

Selected works

Novels

June Jeopardy, Huebsch, 1908
Phoebe and Ernest, Holt, 1910 – illustrated by R. F. Schabelitz
Janey: being the record of a short interval in the journey through life and the struggle with society of a little girl of nine, Holt, 1911
Phoebe, Ernest, and Cupid, Holt, 1912 – illustrated by R. F. Schabelitz
Angel Island, Holt, 1914 – reprinted, Arno, 1978; new edition, NAL Plume, 1988 with an introduction by Ursula K. Le Guin
The Ollivant Orphans, Holt 1915
The Lady of Kingdoms, George H. Doran, 1917
The Happy Years, Holt, 1919
Out of the Air, Harcourt, 1921
The Lost Diana (novella), Everybody's Magazine, June 1923
Discarded, serialized in The American Magazine, May–November 1925
Gertrude Haviland's Divorce, Harper, 1925
Gideon, Harper, 1927
P.D.F.R.: A New Novel, Harper, 1928
Family Circle, Bobbs-Merrill, 1931
Youth Must Laugh, Bobbs-Merrill, 1932
Strange Harvest, Bobbs-Merrill, 1934
Murder Masquerade, H. Smith & R. Haas, 1935
Little Miss Redhead, Lothrop, 1936 – self-illustrated
The Poison Cross Mystery, H. Smith & R. Haas, 1936
A Body Rolled Downstairs, Random House, 1938
Many Murders, Random House, 1941
The Women Swore Revenge, Random House, 1946

The Maida books

Maida's Little Shop, Grosset & Dunlap, 1909
Maida's Little House, Grosset & Dunlap, 1921
Maida's Little School, Grosset & Dunlap, 1926
Maida's Little Island, Grosset & Dunlap, 1939
Maida's Little Camp, Grosset & Dunlap, 1940
Maida's Little Village, Grosset & Dunlap, 1942
Maida's Little Houseboat, Grosset & Dunlap, 1943
Maida's Little Theater, Grosset & Dunlap, 1946
Maida's Little Cabins, Grosset & Dunlap, 1947
Maida's Little Zoo, Grosset & Dunlap, 1949
Maida's Little Lighthouse, Grosset & Dunlap, 1951
Maida's Little Hospital, Grosset & Dunlap, 1952
Maida's Little Farm, Grosset & Dunlap, 1953
Maida's Little House Party, Grosset & Dunlap, 1954
Maida's Little Treasure Hunt, Grosset & Dunlap, 1955

Short stories

"The Father of His Son", Everybody's Magazine, July 1904
"A Doorstep Introduction", Pearson's Magazine, November 1904
"Love Me, Love My Dog", Pearson's Magazine, November 1904
"The Start", Everybody's Magazine, December 1904
"The Matchbreakers", Hampton's Broadway Magazine, November 1908
"The Eternal Challenge", Everybody's Magazine, January 1912
"With Pitfall and With Gin", Pictorial Review, February 1912
"The Woman Across the Street", Ladies' Home Journal, September 1916
"The Sixth Canvassar", The Century, January 1916
"The Last Cartridge", McCall's, October 1922
"The Spring Flight", McCall's, June 1924 – winner of the 1924 O. Henry Memorial Prize
"The Irish Language", Everybody's Magazine, July 1925

Non-fictionThe Californiacs, A. M. Robertson, 1916 – a travel book about CaliforniaThe Native Son, A. M. Robertson, 1919 – a book on CaliforniaThe Story of the Women's Party, Harcourt, 1921; published as Up Hill With Banners Flying, Traversity Press, 1964 – a biography of the National Women's Party's and a history of the suffragistsAngels and Amazons: A Hundred Years of American Women, Doubleday, 1933 – a collection of biographical sketchesGood Manners for Girls, Appleton-Century, 1937
"You Bet I Am!" (article), Woman's Day, October 1938Adventures of Yesterday, General Microfilm, 1973 – an autobiography
Source: Feminist Science Fiction, Fantasy and UtopiaSee also

List of suffragists and suffragettes

 References 

Further reading
 Trigg, Mary K. Feminism as Life's Work: Four Modern American Women through Two World Wars (Rutgers University Press, 2014) xii + 266 pp. online review
 Nyberg, Lyle Summer Suffragists: Woman Suffrage Activists in Scituate, Massachusetts'' (Scituate, MA: by author, 2020) + 284 pp., ch. 2

Primary sources

External links

Free ebooks by Inez Haynes Gillmore at manybooks.net
Will Irwin and Inez Haynes Gillmore Papers. Yale Collection of American Literature, Beinecke Rare Book and Manuscript Library.
Inez Haynes Gillmore Papers, Schlesinger Library, Radcliffe Institute for Advanced Study, Harvard University.
An Inez Haynes Gillmore Irwin Bibliography .

1873 births
1970 deaths
Writers from Boston
Writers from Rio de Janeiro (city)
American feminist writers
American suffragists
American science fiction writers
O. Henry Award winners
Women science fiction and fantasy writers
National Woman's Party activists
20th-century American women writers
20th-century Brazilian women writers
20th-century Brazilian writers
American women children's writers
American children's writers
College Equal Suffrage League